The MagPi is the official Raspberry Pi magazine. It started off life as a free fanzine for users of the  computer. It was created by the community as an unofficial volunteer produced  publication and in 2015 was handed over to the Raspberry Pi Foundation to be run in-house as the official Raspberry Pi magazine. It was launched in May 2012 and contains news, projects and tutorials.

Reception
Writing in LinuxNov at the time of the launch, Mohamed Hussein considered it to be "really worth" downloading for its informative and helpful content. However, he did consider it to be a "venture worth supporting" in the longer term.

Writing in The Wall Street Journals Tech Europe blog, Ben Rooney described the magazine as having a "comforting nostalgic feel" but questioned whether this would appeal to a new generation of programmers.

References

External links

Raspberry Pi Remote Access
The Magpi magazines (Archived)

Raspberry Pi
Free magazines
Magazines established in 2012
Monthly magazines published in the United Kingdom
Computer magazines published in the United Kingdom
Mass media in Cambridge